Spyrydon (secular name Oleh Mykhaylovych Babskyi; May 13, 1958 – May 1, 2011) was the Russian Orthodox priest and for some years Ukrainian Orthodox archbishop of the Ukrainian Orthodox Church of the Kyivan Patriarchate (1992–1994).

Oleh Babskyi was born on May 13, 1958, in Zhytomyr city, now in Ukraine. During 1977-1981 he attended the Theological Seminary in Leningrad (now is Sankt-Petersburg), ROC and, after his marriage in March 1981, was ordained as a deacon by Archbishop of Tikhvin, Meliton Solovyov. On April 19, 1981, he was ordained a priest by Archbishop of Smolensk and Vyazma, Feodosiy Protsyuk. He served as a parish priest in ROC and graduated in absentia from the Theological Academy in Moscow (1985–1989) with a Th.D. degree.

In 1989 he was elevated to the dignity of archpriest. He was divorced from his wife, and supported Metropolitan Filaret (Denysenko) in split from the ROC and the creation of the Ukrainian Orthodox Church of the Kyivan Patriarchate. On June 6, 1992, he tonsured as a monk with name Spyrydon and next day, June 7, 1992, he was consecrated as first bishop of the UOC KP as titular Bishop of Pereyaslav-Khmelnytskyi, auxiliary of the Kyiv Eparchy. Consecration was in St Volodymyr's Cathedral in Kyiv by Metr. of Kyiv and all Ukraine Filaret Denysenko and Bishop of Pochayiv Yakiv Panchuk. On July 25, 1992, he was appointed as Bishop of Lutsk and Volyn and in December 1992 was elevated to the dignity of Archbishop and appointed Archbishop of Dnipropetrovsk and Zaporizzhya. In 1993 he was appointed as Archbishop of Vinnytsia and Bratslav. On December 25, 1993 he left the UOC KP and again joined the ROC. He was accepted only as Archpriest Oleh Babskyi and in 1994 tonsured again as monk, but with name Vasyliy.

In 1997 he converted to the Catholic Church and incardinated to Kyiv-Vyshhorod Exarchate of the UGCC and was appointed parish priest in one among the parishes in Lutsk city. On October 10, 2004, he left the Church and joined to the Ukrainian Autocephalous Orthodox Church Canonical as Archbishop of Lutsk and Volyn Vasyliy. On August 5, 2005, he was joined to the Ukrainian Orthodox Church in America (not confuse this organization with Ukrainian Orthodox Church of the USA) as archbishop of Lutsk and Volyn, and changed again his name to Spyrydon (in June 2006). On January 28, 2008, he joined to the True Russian Orthodox Church (some marginal organization) as Archbishop of Lutsk and Volyn, but on May 29, 2009, he retired for health reasons. But in  he had  with the True Orthodox Church-Archepiscopacy of Slobodzhansk (other organization, that split from the True Russian Orthodox Church). He died in Zhytomyr on May 1, 2011.

Notes

External links
Profile at Anti-Raskol.ru site 

1958 births
2011 deaths
20th-century Eastern Orthodox archbishops
21st-century Eastern Orthodox archbishops
Russian Orthodox Christians from the Soviet Union
Bishops of the Ukrainian Orthodox Church of the Kyivan Patriarchate
Ukrainian Autocephalous Orthodox Church Canonical